Augenblick Studios is an independent animation studio founded in 1999 by Aaron Augenblick, and located in Brooklyn, New York City. The company has created a wide array of animated shorts for television, film, and the Internet, with a target audience typically being adults. Their clients include Cartoon Network, Comedy Central, Adult Swim, the TED conference, PBS, MTV, and Nickelodeon.

History 
Aaron Augenblick studied animation at the School of Visual Arts in New York City. After graduating in 1997, Augenblick worked at MTV Animation on shows such as Daria, Downtown, and Cartoon Sushi.

In 1999, Augenblick opened Augenblick Studios in the Dumbo section of Brooklyn. The first cartoon produced by the company was "Ramblin' Man", an independent short film based on the Hank Williams song. "Ramblin' Man" was released to critical acclaim and was a 2001 SXSW award winner. Several other independent shorts followed, including "Drunky" (2001) and "Plugs McGinniss" (2003).

The first television production from Augenblick Studios was Shorties Watchin' Shorties on Comedy Central in 2004. The show featured animated interpretations of stand up comedy segments from comedians including Denis Leary, Patton Oswalt, Louis C.K., Dane Cook, and Mitch Hedberg. In 2004, Augenblick Studios produced the animated content for two seasons of PFFR's Wonder Showzen on MTV2. Augenblick created short segments, motion graphics, and illustrations for the show.

In 2006, they created the faux-documentary Golden Age for Comedy Central, which was an official selection of the Sundance Film Festival. In 2007, Augenblick Studios animated the short "Lying Rhino" for the feature film comedy The Ten. In 2008, the studio completed 11 episodes of Superjail! for the Adult Swim programming block on Cartoon Network. They also created several short cartoons for Yo Gabba Gabba on Nickelodeon.

Augenblick Studios created 31 episodes of the Comedy Central series Ugly Americans which aired between 2010 and 2012. In 2011, the studio also created a video for the track "Another Tattoo" on Weird Al Yankovic's album Alpocalypse. In 2013, they worked on a cartoon short for Saturday Night Live, with SNL writer Zach Kanin. In 2015, Augenblick Studios collaborated with Animation Domination High Def on Golan the Insatiable, a primetime half-hour series for Fox. In 2015, Augenblick Studios animated a new TV series written and created by Tyler, the Creator called The Jellies! which premiered in 2017. Augenblick Studios also did additional animation for the Cartoon Network animated series MAD. The Netflix series Losers, released in March 2019, features animated segments created by Augenblick Studios.

In January 2016, Augenblick Studios announced it is producing its first animated feature film, The Adventures of Drunky. The R-rated comedy stars Sam Rockwell, Jeffrey Tambor, Steve Coogan, and Nina Arianda. Its release date was slated to be 2018, but was stalled due to Jeffrey Tambor's sexual harassment allegations. On September 24, 2021, it was stated that the film will be completed in 2022.

Death Hacks, was released on Snapchat on August 29, 2020. The company produces Teenage Euthanasia which started airing on Adult Swim in September 2021.

In 2021,  was established as a children's animation division with Augenblick and Daniel Powell as co-founders.

Filmography

Television

Feature films

Short films

Music videos

References

 God v. Devil v. ‘Drunky' In New R-Rated Animated Feature
 Augenblick Studios and Tyler the Creator Launch "The Jellies"
 Augenblick Studios Animates "The Ten"

External links 
 
 Aaron Augenblick interview on Cartoon Brew

American animation studios
Mass media companies established in 1999
Companies based in Brooklyn
1999 establishments in New York City
Adult animation studios
American companies established in 1999
Privately held companies based in New York City